Jones Brook is a  stream in eastern New Hampshire in the United States. It is a tributary of the Branch River, which leads to the Salmon Falls River, part of the Piscataqua River watershed leading to the Atlantic Ocean.

Jones Brook rises in the Moose Mountains, on the border between Brookfield and Middleton, New Hampshire, and flows southeast through Middleton. Upon entering Milton, the stream turns back to the north and joins the Branch River downstream from the village of Union.

See also

List of rivers of New Hampshire

References

Rivers of New Hampshire
Rivers of Carroll County, New Hampshire
Rivers of Strafford County, New Hampshire